Spiritestis is a genus of trematodes in the family Haploporidae.

Species
Spiritests arabii Nagaty, 1948
Spiritestis herveyensis Pulis & Overstreet, 2013
Spiritestis machidai Pulis & Overstreet, 2013

References

Haploporidae